Steòrnabhagh a Deas (English: Stornoway South) is one of the nine wards used to elect members of the Comhairle nan Eilean Siar. It elects four Councillors.

Councillors

Election Results

2022 Election
2022 Comhairle nan Eilean Siar election

2017 Election
2017 Comhairle nan Eilean Siar election

2012 Election
2012 Comhairle nan Eilean Siar election

2007 Election
2007 Comhairle nan Eilean Siar election

References

Wards of Na h-Eileanan Siar